Zion is a dispersed rural community in Port Hope, Northumberland County, Ontario, Canada.

History
Prior to 1833, the Log School House in Zion served as a school and church, and nearby Dickenson's Field was a cemetery.  A brick church called Zion Church was erected in 1839, with a basement for Sunday school classes, and a new cemetery next to the church.  The church was renamed Zion United Church in 1925.

Zion had a post office from 1874 to 1916.

In 1890, Zion had a butcher, blacksmith, and public school.  Residents received daily mail, and there was a daily stage coach to Port Hope.  The population was 70.

References

Communities in Northumberland County, Ontario